153 (one hundred [and] fifty-three) is the natural number following 152 and preceding 154.

In mathematics

The number 153 is associated with the geometric shape known as the Vesica Piscis or Mandorla.

As a triangular number, 153 is the sum of the first 17 integers, and is also the sum of the first five positive factorials:.

The number 153 is also a hexagonal number, and a truncated triangle number, meaning that 1, 15, and 153 are all triangle numbers.

The distinct prime factors of 153 add up to 20, and so do the ones of 154, hence the two form a Ruth-Aaron pair.

Since , it is a 3-narcissistic number, and it is also the smallest three-digit number which can be expressed as the sum of cubes of its digits. Only five other numbers can be expressed as the sum of the cubes of their digits: 0, 1, 370, 371 and 407. It is also a Friedman number, since 153 = 3 × 51.

The Biggs–Smith graph is a symmetric graph with 153 edges, all equivalent.

Another feature of the number 153 is that it is the limit of the following algorithm:

 Take a random positive integer, divisible by three
 Split that number into its base 10 digits
 Take the sum of their cubes
 Go back to the second step

An example, starting with the number 84:

There are 153 uniform polypeta that are generated from four different fundamental Coxeter groups in six-dimensional space.

In the Bible

The Gospel of John (chapter 21:1–14) includes the narrative of the miraculous catch of 153 fish as the third appearance of Jesus after his resurrection.

The precision of the number of fish in this narrative has long been considered peculiar, and many scholars have argued that 153 has some deeper significance. Jerome, for example, wrote that Oppian's Halieutica listed 153 species of fish, although this could not have been the intended meaning of the Gospel writer because Oppian composed Halieutica after the Gospel text was written, and at any rate never gave a list of fish species that clearly adds up to 153.

The number is clearly an intentional detail, given the lack of precision and detail elsewhere in the story; and theologians have lent much credence to Augustine's numerology simply because it comes from historic rather than contemporary theology.

Jerome reached much the same conclusion as Augustine that the figure is an allegorical representation of totality, but through more straightforward means rather than through numerology.
In his Commentary on Ezekiel he propounded the hypothesis that 153 was meant to represent the whole universe of fish, citing as proof that contemporary poets, giving Oppian as an example, believed that there were 153 species of fish in the world.
However, Robert M. Grant disproved Jerome's hypothesis by noting that Oppian actually enumerated only 149 (as catalogued by Alexander William Mair) fish species in his Halieutica (or only 152 "by adding 3 worms", in Grant's words).
What Oppian actually said, moreover, was that only the gods knew the number; and other ancient authors gave different numbers that still were not 153, such as Pliny The Elder in Naturalis Historia (9.43) recording only 74, 104, or 144 (depending from how one counts, and whether one includes hard shelled animals) species of fish, and Quintus Ennius as reported by Apuleius enumerating "countless kinds of fish".
"Every ancient ichthyologian counted the number of species differently." stated Grant.

David Strauss had in fact pointed out the same thing about Oppian in his Leben Jesu the century before Grant.
From a strictly biological point of view, moreover, only 24 species of fish had been recorded in the Sea of Galilee by the turn of the 20th century.
Theologians have continued to support Jerome's hypothesis despite Grant and Strauss, arguing variously that Jerome may have had access to other works of Oppian that are now lost, that Oppian was writing a century after the Gospel of John and at least came close, and that perhaps (despite his having mentioned Oppian by name) Jerome's reference to multiple writers actually meant other writers entirely.
Grant himself opined that "there is every reason to suppose" that in fact Jerome had not actually checked Oppian's writing directly for this information, but was rather recounting secondhand some earlier Christian commentary on the Gospel of John.

Many other numerological interpretations have been propounded, from adding numerological representations of Simon's name to the Greek word for fish through the additions (100+50+7) of Cyril of Alexandria to the multiplications (17×3×3) of Gregory the Great.
Frédéric Louis Godet characterized them as "strange".
There were at least 18 distinct numerological explanations when John Emerton performed "a quick survey" in 1958.
Emerton proceeded to then add a gematrial explanation, to which 8 others have been added since.
Professor of the New Testament, Craig S. Keener observed in 2010 the several gematrial explanations, critiquing ideas such as reversing the order of the Greek alphabet as being "forced", noting that a "children of God" reading of the number "import[s] a ministry image from Mark 1:17 that John never mentions", and commenting on allegorical suggestions linking to Moses that "one wonders whether John could have expected any members of his original audience to catch"; summarizing that gematrial explanations that may scholars have put forward are too complex to be discovered without starting from the answer desired and working backwards from there, and that the plethora of such explanations all distinct from one another itself indicates their weakness.

However, there have been more prosaic and literal explanations, including the simple straightforward one that the detail is simply correct, and 153 is the number of fish caught. John Bernard argued by quoting Edwin Hatch that "The idea that ancient literature consists of riddles which it is the business of modern literature to solve has passed for ever away.", pointing out the irony of a Gnostic-like search for meaning in the tale when John himself was simply being quite literal. Godet, likewise, asserted that it was just "a simple fact recalled to mind".

R. Alan Culpepper (who was dean of the McAfee School of Theology at Mercer University) observed, in his 2021 overview of seven distinct classes of argument about the number, that whilst there are arguments in favour of symbolic interpretations "Nevertheless, the text gives no basis for interpreting the number." Professor of New Testament Studies Timothy James Wiarda stated that "It is sufficient to note that the text offers the reader no hint concerning any symbolism in the miraculous catch of fish.". Keener, having discounted gematria, Jerome (per Grant and Strauss), and Augustine (with a simple analysis of how probable it is to pick numbers that have at least some special property, be that they are triangular, square, prime, or otherwise), concludes that the straightforward explanation is the more likely one and that "the number could simply stem from an accurate memory of a careful count on the occasion", quoting Archibald Macbride Hunter in hise 1965 Cambridge Bible Commentaries that it is "no more symbolical than the hundred yards that Peter swam.  It is the remembered number of a 'bumper' catch."

Culpepper's three other classes (aside from Jerome, literalism, gematria, and Augustine) are algebraic interpretations based on 153 itself, algebraic interpretations based on the number 17, and the hypothesis that the symbolic meaning of the number exists but is no longer discoverable.

Cornelius à Lapide writes that the "multitude of fishes mystically represents the multitude of the faithful which Peter and the Apostles afterwards caught by the net of evangelical preaching, and converted to Christ".

Augustine of Hippo argued that the significance lay in the fact that 153 is the sum of the first 17 integers (i.e. 153 is the 17th triangular number), with 17 representing the combination of divine grace (the seven gifts of the Holy Spirit) and law (the Ten Commandments). Theologian D. A. Carson discusses this and other interpretations and concludes that "if the Evangelist has some symbolism in mind connected with the number 153, he has hidden it well", while other scholars note that "no symbolic significance for the number of 153 fish in John 21:11 has received widespread support."

Writers claiming a major role for Mary Magdalene have noted that in Greek isopsephy her epithet "η Μαγδαληνή" bears the number 8 + 40 + 1 + 3 + 4 + 1 + 30 + 8 + 50 + 8 = 153, thus, it is suggested, revealing her importance. Similarly, the phrase "τὸ δίκτυον" (the net) used in the passage bears the number 1224 = 8 × 153, as do some other phrases. The significance of this is unclear, given that Koine Greek provides a choice of several noun endings with different isopsephy values.  The number 153 has also been related to the vesica piscis, with the claim that Archimedes used 153 as a "shorthand or abbreviation" for the square root of 3 in his On the Measurement of the Circle. However, examination of that work  shows this to be only partly correct.

Evagrius Ponticus referred to the catch of 153 fish, as well as to the mathematical properties of the number (153 = 100 + 28 + 25, with 100 a square number, 28 a triangular number and 25 a circular number) when describing his 153-chapter work on prayer. Louis de Montfort, in his fifth method of saying the Rosary, connects the catch of 153 fish with the number of Hail Marys said (3 plus 15 sets of 10), while St Paul's School in London was founded in 1512 by John Colet to teach 153 poor men's children, also in reference to the catch.

In the military

  was a United States Navy auxiliary ship during the Vietnam War
  was a United States Navy Trefoil-class concrete barge during World War II
  was a United States Navy  during World War II
  was a United States Navy  during World War II
  was a United States Navy naval fighting ship during World War II
  was a United States Navy  ship during World War II
  was a United States Navy  during World War II
  was a United States Navy  during World War II
  was a United States Navy  during World War II
 The 153d Airlift Wing is a unit of the United States Air Force, located at Cheyenne Regional Airport, Cheyenne, Wyoming.
 The 153d Air Refueling Squadron is a unit of the Mississippi Air National Guard, flying the KC-135 Stratotanker
 The 153rd Illinois Volunteer Infantry Regiment was an infantry regiment that served in the Union Army during the American Civil War
 The Russian Soviet Polikarpov I-153 Chaika ("Seagull") was a late 1930s biplane fighter which saw combat during World War II
In the 39th Brigade Combat Team, Arkansas Army National Guard, the two maneuver battalions are of the 153d Infantry Regiment, 1BN 153IN units located in the southwestern part of Arkansas, 2BN 153IN located in the north central region of Arkansas.

In transportation
 British Rail Class 153 is a single-car diesel multiple unit train
 Caledonian Airways Flight 153 from Douala International Airport, Douala, Cameroon crashed on March 4, 1962
 The Peugeot Type 153 car, produced between 1913 and 1925
 153rd Street station on Metra's SouthWest Service in Orland Park, Illinois

In sports
 Australian rules footballer Scott Hodges had a SANFL season goal kicking record of 153 in 1990

In radio and TV

 The frequency of the longwave transmitters Donebach, Ingøy, Braşov, and Kenadsa is 153 kHz

In other fields
153 is also:
 The year AD 153 or 153 BC
 The year 153 AH in the Islamic calendar that corresponds to 769 – 770 CE
 The code for malignant neoplasm of the colon in the International Statistical Classification of Diseases and Related Health Problems
 The code for "mental processes & intelligence" in the Dewey Decimal Classification
 A reference to a comet (153P/Ikeya-Zhang) discovered in 2002
 A reference to a large asteroid with a dark surface (153 Hilda) in the outer Main belt
 The ordinal number of the coat of arms of Komi Republic in the State Heraldic Register of the Russian Federation
 The number of combined Arabic and Persian Hidden Words in the Baháʼí Faith.
 The atomic number of an element temporarily called Unpenttrium
 A sonnet by William Shakespeare
 The U.S. Bureau of Transportation Statistics' world area code for Nicaragua
 Number of possible type combinations in the Pokémon series.
 The number of aphorisms outlined by Chr. Pack in 153 Chymical Aphorisms

See also

 Article 153 of the Constitution of Malaysia
 Gregg v. Georgia, 428 U.S. 153 (1976)
 List of highways numbered 153
 United Nations Security Council Resolution 153
 United States Supreme Court cases, Volume 153

References

Bibliography

Further reading

External links
 The Number 153 at The Database of Number Correlations

Integers